A Christmas Cantata (French: Une cantate de Noël; German: Eine Weihnachtskantate) is a Christmas cantata composed by Arthur Honegger in 1953; it is reportedly his last composition.

It requires a mixed choir, a baritone soloist, an organ, an orchestra and a children's choir, and it describes the Christmas story. The cantata is divided into three parts.

References

Compositions by Arthur Honegger
Christmas cantatas
1953 compositions
Music for orchestra and organ
Christmas music